Mukhshi (Turki: ﻥﺭﻥﺝﺍﻁ, Nurinjat IPA [nurinˈdʒɑt])) was the capital city of Murunza and capital of Golden Horde in 14th century during the reign of Öz Beg Khan and his official residence. It was the administrative center of Mukhsha Ulus and one of the Golden Horde centres of coinage. In the 15th century the city lost its importance and declined. The ruins (buildings of bricks, stone baths, Muslim graves) are situated in Penza Oblast near the modern town of Narovchat in the upper stream of Moksha River.

History

Early history 

Noronshasht was the capital of Medieval Moksha kingdom Murunza. Russian Laurentian Codex mentions the name of the king Puresh. Noronshasht was conquered by Batu Khan in 1237.

Foundation and name 
The city foundation date is unknown. The archeological findings confirmed the first city population was Moksha. According to Iosif Cherapkin the first name of the city Noronshasht in Middle Moksha means 'former bog place covered with grass'. The city is often referred to as Mukhsha or Mukhshi which in fact was the name of the ulus Mukhsha (after the name of Mokshaland), the official city name used in the Mongol period was Nurinjat .

Mukhsha Ulus 
Mukhsha became the administrative center of Mukhsha Ulus and residence of Öz Beg Khan in 1313–1342. In 1313-1367 the city minted dangs, dirhams and pūls.
Destroyed by Timur in 1395. In 16th century in Nurindzhat attested private and public baths, running water, sewerage, underfloor heating. The streets were paved with stones, there were fountains with drinking water, cathedral mosque, tavern (teahouse), inns, caravanserai, palace, houses and mausoleums of stone, Muslim cemetery (Noronshasht gravefield). There were 3 potteries with ancient forges and a brick factory. Every brick made in Mukhshi had a special tamga. There was an artisan quarter with numerous workshops. Residential quarters partly lay nowadays under the rural locality Narovchat. Northwest of Narovchat lays another gravefield (old cemetery), divided into Muslim ( named so by later Russian population due to round foundations of mausoluems ruins) and presumably "Pagan" areas. 4 mausoleums and probably a mosque and a minaret ruins were found in the "Mosque field" The Medieval city ruins were discovered by Russian archeologist Aleksandr Krotkov in 1915.

Volga Trade Route 
In 14th century, Mukhshi played an important role on trade route from Don to Black sea (Principality of Theodoro and  Genoese Gazaria colonies in Crimea)

Literature
Making Mongol History: Rashid al-Din and the Jamiʿ al-Tawarikh (Edinburgh Studies in Classical Islamic History and Culture) by Stefan Kamola, Edinburgh University Press; 1st edition (August 14, 2019), 
Golubev O.V. Mokhshi Coinage. Penza, 2020

References

Notes

Footnotes

Sources

External links
 The Golden Horde coinage
Kairat Zakiryanov. Turkic Saga of Jenghiz Khan & КЗ-factor: Documented Research. 2013. In Russian,

See also
Mokshas
Golden Horde
Mukhsha Ulus
Middle Volga region

History of the Mongol Empire
Medieval Russia
History of Penza Oblast
Defunct towns in Russia
Geography of Penza Oblast
Golden Horde
Former populated places in Russia
Narovchatsky District

mdf:Норзяд